Frank Emmanuel Tolbert (February 3, 1910 – April 22, 1980) was a Liberian politician and brother of President William R. Tolbert, Jr.  The oldest son of William R. Tolbert Sr., national chairman of the ruling True Whig Party, he grew up in Bensonville, attended Zion Praise Baptist Church, graduated from Liberia College, and became involved in politics relatively early in life.  As his family became more and more closely connected to the family of Supreme Court Justice William V.S. Tubman, Frank began to become prominent: when Tubman ran for President in 1943, he was rumoured to be Tubman's first choice for Vice President, although his younger brother William was eventually chosen, perhaps because of Frank's unpredictable moods and violent temper.

Despite being passed over for Vice President, Frank remained active in the TWP and national politics.  By 1976, he was a member of the Senate and had been elected its President Pro Tempore.  He was abruptly removed from office in 1980 by a military coup d'état: on 12 April, a group of enlisted men calling themselves the "People's Redemption Council murdered President Tolbert, arrested Frank Tolbert and many other high officials, and proclaimed themselves the country's new government.  After a rapid trial in a kangaroo court, Tolbert and the others were summarily executed by firing squad on a Monrovia beach ten days after the coup.

References

1910 births
1980 deaths
Extrajudicial killings
Liberian Baptists
Liberian people
Americo-Liberian people
People of Americo-Liberian descent
Frank E.
Members of the Senate of Liberia
Presidents pro tempore of the Senate of Liberia
Executed Liberian people
People from Montserrado County
True Whig Party politicians
University of Liberia alumni
People executed by Liberia by firing squad
Filmed executions
20th-century Baptists
20th-century Liberian politicians